40 athletes (37 men and 3 women) from Israel competed at the 1996 Summer Paralympics in Atlanta, United States.

Medallists

References 

Nations at the 1996 Summer Paralympics
1996
Summer Paralympics